The 1928 Indiana gubernatorial election was held on November 6, 1928. Republican nominee Harry G. Leslie defeated Democratic nominee Frank C. Dailey with 51.25% of the vote.

, this marks the last time Lake County voted Republican in a gubernatorial election.

General election

Candidates
Major party candidates
Harry G. Leslie, Republican, Speaker of the Indiana House of Representatives
Frank C. Dailey, Democratic

Other candidates
Albert Stanley, Prohibition
Clarence E. Bond, Socialist
Cassimer Benward, Socialist Labor
Harry W. Garner, Workers
Henry O. Shaw, Independent

Results

References

1928
Indiana
Gubernatorial